The Goldfish is a 1924 American silent comedy film directed by Jerome Storm and starring Constance Talmadge, Jack Mulhall, and Frank Elliott.

Plot
As described in a film magazine review, Jennie Wetherby and her husband Jimmy agree that if they tire of wedded life, she or he will hand the other a bowl of goldfish, signifying that their marital partnership is ended. They quarrel and Jimmy carries out the threat, giving Jenny a bowl of goldfish. Won by Herman Krauss, Jenny gives him the goldfish in favor of millionaire J. Hamilton Powers. The latter dies, leaving her a wealthy widow. She is about to wed the Duke of Middlesex, when Krauss brings the old sweethearts together again. The Duke gets the goldfish and Jimmy and Jenny are reunited.

Cast

Preservation
An incomplete copy of The Goldfish is held by the Library of Congress.

References

Bibliography
 Munden, Kenneth White. The American Film Institute Catalog of Motion Pictures Produced in the United States, Part 1. University of California Press, 1997.

External links

Still at silenthollywood.com

1924 films
1924 comedy films
Silent American comedy films
Films directed by Jerome Storm
American silent feature films
1920s English-language films
First National Pictures films
American black-and-white films
1920s American films